Orla may refer to:

Places
Orla, Missouri, USA
Orla, Texas, USA
Orla, Jharkhand, India
Orla, Podlaskie Voivodeship (north-east Poland), a village
Gmina Orla, a commune centred on the village
Orla, Krotoszyn County in Greater Poland Voivodeship (west-central Poland)
Orla, Wągrowiec County in Greater Poland Voivodeship (west-central Poland)
Orła, Łódź Voivodeship (central Poland)

Rivers
Orla (Barycz), a river in Poland, tributary of the Barycz
Orla (Saale), a river in Thuringia, Germany, tributary of the Saale
Orla (Kleine Röder), a river in Saxony, Germany, tributary of the Kleine Röder

Other uses
Orla (name), a female given name of Irish origin (and sometimes a male given name of Danish origin)
Tropical Storm Orla (disambiguation)
Orla coat of arms Polish Szlachta coat of arms
LÉ Orla (P41), a ship of the Irish navy
Orla.fm, the only bi-lingual radio station for Polish and English-speaking audiences in the United Kingdom and Ireland
Orla Railway in southern Germany